The 2017 49er & 49er FX World Championships were held in Matosinhos, Portugal 28 August – 2 September 2017. 140 teams from 27 nations competed in the regatta that saw British Dylan Fletcher-Scott and Stuart Bithell  as winners of the 49er class and Danish Jena Mai Hansen and Katja Salskov-Iversen  as winners of the 49er FX class.

Results

49er

49er FX

References

External links

49er & 49er FX World Championships
49er & 49er FX World Championships
Sailing competitions in Portugal
2017 in Portuguese sport